Tabbat or Tabat may refer to:
 Tabbat, Bukan, a village in Behi-e Feyzolah Beygi Rural District, in the Central District of Bukan County, West Azerbaijan Province, Iran
 Tabbat, Urmia, a village in Torkaman Rural District, in the Central District of Urmia County, West Azerbaijan Province, Iran

See also
Tabati (also Romanized as Tabatī and Tabbatī; also known as Tabalsi), a village in Miyan Ab-e Shomali Rural District, in the Central District of Shushtar County, Khuzestan Province, Iran